The vibrational temperature is commonly used in thermodynamics, to simplify certain equations. It has units of temperature and is defined as

The vibrational temperature is used commonly when finding the vibrational partition function.

References
Statistical thermodynamics University Arizona

See also
Rotational temperature
Rotational spectroscopy
Vibrational spectroscopy
Infrared spectroscopy
Spectroscopy

Atomic physics
Molecular physics